Antonio Manrique de Lara, 2nd Duke of Nájera (died 13 December 1535) was a Spanish noble and military leader, and Viceroy of Navarre between 1516 and 1521.

He was the second son of Pedro Manrique de Lara, captain general of Army of Navarre and capitán general de la Frontera de Aragón, Navarra y Jaén. His mother was Guiomar de Castro.

His father was named 1st Duke of Nájera by Ferdinand II of Aragon and Isabella I of Castile on 30 August 1482. Antonio became second Duke in 1515, when his father died.
He was also 3rd Count of Treviño.

In 1519 he was made a knight in the Order of the Golden Fleece by Charles I of Spain.

Appointed viceroy of Navarre by Cardinal Cisneros in 1516, he was ordered to pacify the newly conquered Kingdom. But he acted in such a brutal manner, that he became much hated by the Navarrese. When the son of the former King of Navarre, Henry II sent a large French/Navarrese army commanded by General André de Foix to reconquer his Kingdom, the Navarrese population supported them and in less than three weeks, all of Navarre was retaken.

In 1520 he participated in the repression of the Revolt of the Comuneros and in 1521 he defeated the French in the Siege of Logroño, and the Battle of Noáin.

After the reconquest of the Kingdom by the Spanish, Antonio was sidelined and retired to his estates in La Rioja, where he died in 1535.

Marriage and children 

He married in 1503 with Juana Cardona Y Enriquez (died 1547), sister of Fernando Ramon Folch, 2nd Duke of Cardona. 
They had seven children :
 Juan Esteban (1504–1558), 3rd Duke of Nájera, knight in the Order of the Golden Fleece.
 Aldonza, no issue.
 Guiomar (died 1543), no issue.
 Juan Fernandéz (1508–1570), viceroy of Naples in 1558, had issue.
 Rodrigo, had issue.
 María, no issue.
 Bernardino (died 1999), had issue.

16th-century Spanish military personnel
102
1535 deaths
Knights of the Golden Fleece
Viceroys of Navarre
Year of birth unknown